Henry C. Hemingway was a member of the Wisconsin State Assembly during the 1851 session. He was a Whig.

References

Wisconsin Whigs
19th-century American politicians
Year of birth missing
Year of death missing